Excelsior Motor Manufacturing & Supply Company was an American motorcycle manufacturer operating in Chicago from 1907 to 1931. It was purchased by Ignaz Schwinn, proprietor of bicycle manufacturer Arnold, Schwinn & Co. in 1912. In 1912, an Excelsior was the first motorcycle to be officially timed at a speed of 100 mph.  The Henderson Motorcycle Company became a division of Excelsior when Schwinn purchased Henderson in 1917. By 1928, Excelsior was in third place in the U.S. motorcycle market behind Indian and Harley-Davidson.  The Great Depression convinced Schwinn to order Excelsior's operations to cease in September 1931.

Excelsior BigX

The mainstay of Excelsior production through the 1910s and into the 1920s was the  Model BigX. This had an inlet-over-exhaust v-twin engine, firstly with belt drive then with 2 speed and then 3 speed gearbox. Colors were grey with red panels in the early teens, the 'Military Model' of the late teens was in khaki (a green-brown shade) and 1920s models were in a very dark blue with fine gold pinstriping. Many were exported, Europe and Australia receiving a number of shipments. A very small number of BigX motorcycles were manufactured with  engines in the 1920s. Production of the BigX continued until 1924, when it was replaced by the Super X.

Excelsior Super X

Excelsior released its Super X model in 1925. The Super X was America's first motorcycle with a  V-twin engine. The Super X was conceived as a competitor to the smaller Indian Scout.

End of production
In 1929, the stock market crash and the resulting Great Depression caused motorcycle sales to plummet. The summer of 1931 saw Schwinn call his department heads together for a meeting at Excelsior. He bluntly told them, with no prior indication, “Gentlemen, today we stop." Schwinn felt that the Depression could easily continue for eight years, and even worsen. Despite a full order book, he had chosen to pare back his business commitments to the core business of bicycle manufacture. All motorcycle operations at Excelsior ended by September 1931.

References

See also
List of motorcycles of the 1910s
List of motorcycles of the 1920s
List of motorcycles of the 1930s

Defunct motorcycle manufacturers of the United States
Motorcycles introduced in the 1900s
Motor vehicle manufacturers based in Illinois
Vehicle manufacturing companies established in 1907
Vehicle manufacturing companies disestablished in 1931
1907 establishments in Illinois
1931 disestablishments in Illinois